Jacques-Barthélemy Micheli du Crest (September 28, 1690 – March 29, 1766) was a military engineer, physicist and cartographer, born in Geneva and so a citizen of the then Republic of Geneva, now in Switzerland. Born into the aristocracy, he eventually fled to France as an enemy of Geneva and eventually spent his later years in Aarburg Castle as a political prisoner. During his time there, he mapped the Alps accurately using rudimentary tools. One of his other major accomplishments whilst in exile was to create a thermometer and a temperature scale, which was commonly used in Switzerland and around Europe until it became obsolete in the 19th century.

Life before exile 
Du Crest was born into the aristocracy, and during a period in the military he became a Captain and military engineer by the age of 23. In 1721, after leaving the army, he took up his place as a member of the Genevan parliament, as was his family's right, specialising in security. During his time in the parliament, Du Crest argued against the Genevan oligarchy and was an outspoken critic of the planned wall around Geneva. Eventually, due to his views and publishing pamphlets such as "Maxims of a Republican", he was declared an enemy of Geneva, his rights as a citizen were revoked, his lands were confiscated and he was sentenced to death. Du Crest fled to France in 1730, and an effigy was symbolically beheaded in 1735.

Life in exile and as a political prisoner 
Whilst in France, Du Crest spent much of his time dedicated to scientific study. He made advances in the study of temperature and came up with a recognised temperature scale which was used in Switzerland for many years. Du Crest was still outspoken regarding political issues, and lost the support of the people protecting him in France. He was forced to flee again across Europe in 1744, stopping in major cities such as Zurich and Bern, until he became ill and was hospitalised in Bern's Inselspital, where he was arrested in 1746. He was moved to Aarburg Castle, after getting involved with Samuel Henzi's conspiracy, where he was held as a political prisoner for the remainder of his life.

Scientific achievements 
Du Crest devoted a significant portion of his life in exile to scientific study, making pioneering developments in cartography and the measurement of temperature.

Temperature scale 
Du Crest believed that the temperature of the Earth was fundamentally fixed, based on the supposition that cellars and mines maintained an equal temperature. His scale between these points was then divided into one hundred equal degrees.

Thermometer 
Du Crest rejected mercury thermometers, stating that the substance was too difficult to purify, preferring instead alcohol which had passed the gunpowder test. He created a thermometer based the expansion of alcohol, calibrated using mercury. He further published works that explained his belief that alcohol expanded more regularly than mercury, and his experiments matched his scale more accurately than mercury did.

Mapping the Alps 

During his time at Aarburg Castle  he published many meteorological papers and created a cartographical drawing of the Alps as viewed from the castle. Without any modern equipment, such as a theodolite or telescope he instead used an eight-meter long gutter pipe, filled with water to measure levels and a small rod held in front of it, he could measure the heights of the peaks. He then used the Scheuchzer map of 1712 to calculate the distances away, and drew the first scientific panorama of the Alps.

References 

1690 births
1766 deaths
Physicists from the Republic of Geneva
Politicians from the Republic of Geneva
Military engineers
18th-century physicists
18th-century cartographers
18th-century scientists from the Republic of Geneva